Burhanpur is a historical city in the Indian state of Madhya Pradesh. It is the administrative seat of Burhanpur District. The city is a Municipal Corporation.

History

Pre-Mughal period 
Burhanpur was an important city under the Rashtrakuta Dynasty from 753–982. Excavations of the Tapti River and Asirgarh Fort have discovered many coins, goddess idols and temples from the prehistoric era. However, Burhanpur came to prominence during the medieval period.

In 1388, Malik Nasir Khan, the Faruqi dynasty Sultan of Khandesh, discovered Burhanpur, at the behest of Shaikh Zainuddin and named it after a well-known medieval Sufi saint, Burhan-ud-Din. Burhanpur became the capital of the Khandesh sultanate. Later, Miran Adil Khan II (reigned 1457–1501), another sultan of this dynasty, built a citadel and a number of palaces in Burhanpur. During his long reign, Burhanpur was transformed into a major centre for trade and textile production.

Under the Mughals 
In 1601, the Mughal emperor Akbar annexed the Khandesh sultanate and Burhanpur became the capital of Khandesh subah, one of three new top-level provinces in the Mughal empire, added in 1601 (like Berar Subah in 1869 and Ahmadnagar subah in 1601–35) to the initial dozen as he conquered much of the Deccan. The city served as the residence of Khandesh's Mughal governor, Abdul Rahim Khan-i-Khanan, during Akbar and Jahangir's rule. He constructed a new water supply for the city, as well as several gardens. In 1609, Mughal emperor Jahangir appointed his second son Parviz to the governorship of the Mughal provinces of the Deccan, and the prince chose Burhanpur as his headquarters and his residence.

Burhanpur became a beautiful city, and many historical monuments survive in its expanse, mainly dating from the rule of the great Mughal emperor Shah Jahan. Burhanpur was an important Mughal outpost. Shah Jahan spent a considerable amount of time in this city, and helped add to the Shahi Qila. The Shahi Qila is one majestic palace in Burhanpur, located to the west of the Tapti River. Diwan-i-Aam and Diwan-i-Khas were built on the terrace of the Qila. Little of it remains today, as the Qila is mostly in ruins. However, the parts of the palace that are still standing display exquisite sculpture and carvings. The main attraction at the palace is the hamam or royal bath. It was specifically built for Shah Jahan's wife, Mumtaz Mahal so that she could enjoy a luxurious bath. It is said that she died there while giving birth to her fourteenth child. Even today, the ceiling has many intricate paintings.  One of these paintings depicts a monument which is said to have been the inspiration for the Taj Mahal, her final resting place. She was initially buried there for six months before being moved.  The original grave called the Aahukhana is in disrepair.

Around 1670 Daud Khan was the Subhadar (Governor) of Khandesh province, under the rule of Aurangzeb.

Maratha conquest 
In 1705, Santaji Ghorpade attacked Burhanpur and Khandesh subha to force the Mughal emperor Aurangzeb to deploy more forces in Khandesh. This in turn relieved some of the pressure on Karnataka and Maratha swarajya from Mughal armies. In the 1720s, the city was taken by the Maratha Peshwa Bajirao during his expedition to Malwa and Delhi. In the 1750s, a Maratha army under Sadashivrao Bhau, who defeated the Nizam of Hyderabad, took control of the town. At the downfall of the Maratha Empire, the city was given to Maratha Sardar Holkar, Scindia, and then finally in 1818 was handed over to British by the Marathas.

Geography 
Burhanpur is situated on the southwestern border of Madhya Pradesh, near the banks of the Tapti River.

Demographics

As 2011 Indian Census, population of Burhanpur in 2011 was 210,886, of which males and females were 108,187 and 102,699 respectively. The population in the age group of 0 to 6 years was 28,930, of which 15,035 were males and 13,895 were females. The total number of literates in Burhanpur was 147,056, which constituted 69.7% of the population with male literacy of 73.3% and female literacy of 65.9%. The effective literacy rate of 7+ population of Burhanpur was 80.8%, of which male literacy rate was 85.1% and female literacy rate was 76.3%. The Scheduled Castes and Scheduled Tribes population was 14,440 and 2,179 respectively. Burhanpur had 38118 households in 2011.

Islam and Hinduism is followed by 50.5% and 45.8 of the population respectively, with small number of Sikhs and Christians.

Urdu is the most commonly spoken language. Hindi and Marathi are the other prominent languages. Gujarati, Sindhi and Marwari are also spoken. Nimadi is the local dialect.

Economy

Industries
Burhanpur is known for its textile industry. It is the largest hub for the power loom industry in the state. It is also known for having one NTC (National Textile Corporation) project. It has a number of textile companies which are well known for interlining cloths, Grey Markin, Bleached Dhoti, Cambric, Power loom Cloth bakram and other types of fabric. There are also several cotton and oil mills in the city.

Tourism 
Burhanpur was ruled by several dynasties, and consequently has many visitor attractions of historical interest. It has three rivers, the Tapti, the Utavali and the Mohna, with several natural sights for visitors to Burhanpur. This small town has four small ghats. Being the home of a very diverse population, Burhanpur has a notable Gurudwara, Masjid, Church, a world-famous Dargah
 Asirgarh Fort – The fort built by Asa Ahir of the Ahir dynasty is notable for its historical architecture. This fort during its prime time was difficult to win because of being built at a great height, with strong outer walls which are still standing intact. It is situated on Burhanpur-Khandwa Highway,  from Burhanpur.
 Shahi Qila – A rare fort with a complete garden on its terrace. It was built in the Farooqi Dynasty and ruled by Shahjahan for a long period of time. His beloved wife Mumtaz died here and it is believed that the Taj Mahal was decided to be made in Burhanpur before the plan was cancelled due to lack of white marble here at the time, though Mumtaz was buried here for six months after her death until Taj Mahal construction was completed.
 Jama Masjid – The Jama Masjid is a historic monument as well as a place of worship. It is centrally located in Gandhi Chowk. The construction of Jama Masjid started in Farooqi rule. The construction of the monument took very long and continued even after Farooqi leader Adil Shah's demise. Then Emperor Akbar supervised and completed the work of the Masjid. There are two large minarets, three round cupolas and extensive artwork on its symmetric pillars which are well conserved.
 Dargah-e-Hakimi – The tomb complex 'Dargah-e-Hakimi' includes mosques, gardens, and accommodation facilities for visitors. Here the holy Dawoodi Bohra saint, Sayyedi Abdul Qadir Hakimuddin is buried, with his monument visited by pilgrims from several countries.

Transport
Burhanpur is well connected to other cities of India via railway network. The city has one railway station, while regular buses are available for travel to nearby cities. The closest airport is Jalgaon Airport, a domestic airport, which is present on south side of the city, while Devi Ahilya Bai Holkar Airport is the nearest customs airport within the state. The Chhatrapati Shivaji Maharaj International Airport is the nearest international airport located in Mumbai in Maharashtra.

In popular culture
 The city is mentioned in Jules Verne's Around the World in 80 Days as Burhampoor.

See also
Zainabadi Mahal, concubine of Aurangzeb from Zainabad in Burhanpur

References

External links

 Burhanpur Historical City
 My Burhanpur - The Historical City
 Burhanpur Gateway to South India

 
Cities and towns in Burhanpur district
Former capital cities in India
Cities in Madhya Pradesh